Perin (also Romanized as Perīn; also known as Ferīn, Parad, and Pīrīn) is a village in Poshtkuh-e Rostam Rural District, Sorna District, Rostam County, Fars Province, Iran. At the 2006 census, its population was 616, in 119 families.

References 

Populated places in Rostam County